General elections were held in the Cook Islands on 20 April 1965 to elect 22 MPs to the Cook Islands Legislative Assembly. The elections were won by the Cook Islands Party and saw Albert Henry become the Cook Islands' first Premier.

Background
The holding of an election was necessary to elect members to approve the proposed constitution. If approved, the new constitution would institute self-government for the Cook Islands.

Because the election had the potential to result in removing the Cook Islands from the United Nations list of non-self-governing territories, the election was observed by representatives of the UN.

The Cook Islands Amendment Act contained a clause limiting candidacy for the elections to people who had lived in the Cook Islands for at least three years before the election. This barred Albert Henry from running, as he had only lived in the Cook Island for a year preceding the vote.

Campaign
A total of 66 candidates contested the 22 seats, 19 from the Cook Islands Party, 16 from the United Political Party (led by Leader of Government business Dick Charles Brown), 12 from the Independent Group, 7 from the Labour Party, and 12 independents. also fielding candidates. Two seats had only one candidate – Tangaroa Tangaroa in Penrhyn and Pupuke Robati in Rakahanga – both of whom were returned unopposed

Results
Leader of Government business Brown, Agriculture Minister Napa Tauei Napa and Speaker Teariki Tuavera were amongst the nine incumbents that lost their seats.

Elected members

Aftermath
The newly elected Assembly met for the first time on 10 May. With Henry still ineligible for election, Manea Tamarua was elected Leader of Government Business. He subsequently announced appointed Julian Dashwood, Tiakana Numanga, Apenera Short, Marguerite Story and Mana Strickland to the Executive Council.

On 11 May Cook Islands Party MPs attempted to amend the Cook Islands Amendment Act to reduce the residency requirement and allow Henry to become an MP. The opposition independents walked out of the legislature, meaning it was not quorate due to the absence of two Cook Islands Party MPs. However, they returned the following day and an amendment to reduce the residency requirement to three months (providing the candidate had previously lived in the Cook Islands for at least a year) was passed. Henry's sister Marguerite Story subsequently resigned from the Assembly to allow him to contest the by-election for Te-au-o-Tonga on 9 July. Henry was challenged by Dick Charles Brown, winning by 1,353 votes to 523.

The Legislative Assembly later approved the constitution on 26 July by 20 votes to two. The two 'no' votes came from Pupuke Robati (who claimed that residents of Rakahanga did not wish for the Cook Islands to become self-governing) and Tangaroa Tangaroa (who claimed that Penrhyn wished to become part of New Zealand). The Cook Islands became self-governing on 4 August 1965 when Henry was sworn in as the first Premier. Henry formed a cabinet with Dashwood, Numanga, Short, Strickland and Tamarua as ministers. On the same day as Henry was sworn in, Marguerite Story was elected unopposed as the Assembly's first Speaker.

Although Henry held numerous portfolios, the other members of the cabinet were Associate Ministers for several of his areas of responsibility; Dashwood was Associate Minister for the Post Office, Hotel and Printing Office, Numanga was Associate Minister of Labour, Short was Associate Minister of Economic Development, Strickland was Associate Minister for Finance, Aviation, Shipping and Immigration, Tamarua was Associate Minister of Economic Development, Finance and Justice.

In June 1966 Dashwood was convicted of attempting to obtain a bribe and was removed from the Assembly and cabinet.  He was also struck off the voter roll and was unable to contest the subsequent by-election. Albert Henry's nephew Tupui Henry was elected in the by-election, and was appointed to the cabinet as Minister of Internal Affairs.

References

Elections in the Cook Islands
Cook
1965 in the Cook Islands
Self-governance
April 1965 events in Oceania